Bluegate Fields (also known as Blue Gate Fields) was one of the worst slum areas that once existed just north of the old, east London docks during the Victorian era.  Two streets in the area had actually been named Bluegate Fields at different times: present-day Dellow Street (along the eastern edge of the St. George's-in-the-East churchyard) and Cable Street (along the northern edge of the churchyard).

The area is visited by the eponymous character in The Picture of Dorian Gray by Oscar Wilde, and inspired a scene in The Mystery of Edwin Drood by Charles Dickens. It is referenced in the title of a song (and live album recorded at Wilton's Music Hall in Graces Alley off Cable Street) by Marc Almond.

References

External links
Description from victorianlondon.org.
Map containing the 1746 location of Bluegate Field (just north of the church yard of St. George's-in-the-east).
Brief but informative description of Blue Gate Fields.

History of the London Borough of Tower Hamlets
Former slums of London